Malcolm X College, one of the City Colleges of Chicago, is a two-year college located on the Near West Side of Chicago, Illinois. It was founded as Crane Junior College in 1911 and was the first of the City Colleges. Crane ceased operations at the beginning of the Great Depression and was reopened in as Theodore Herzl Junior College, located in the North Lawndale neighborhood on Chicago's West Side in 1934. Needing a new campus in the late 1960s, Herzel's building was changed into an elementary school. In 1969, the school was named in honor of civil rights advocate and orator Malcolm X on its move to a new campus in the Near West Side.

Malcolm X College works with healthcare and industry partners to provide students with career-oriented education in the healthcare field. The school's main corporate partner is Rush University Medical Center, which helps the school write curriculum, teach, and place students in jobs. The school also has 18 other healthcare and industry partners, including Walgreens and GE Healthcare.

History
Crane Junior College, the first city college in Chicago, was founded in 1911 to be a junior college for the graduates of the nearby Crane High School. During the Great Depression, the financially strapped Chicago Board of Education considered closing the school but after arguments from Clarence Darrow, it remained open as the Theodore Herzl Junior College, named for the founder of the modern Zionism movement. During World War II, Herzl Junior College was leased by the United States Navy and used in training thousands of Navy personnel as a part of the Electronics Training Program.

In 1968, at the request of the local community, the school was renamed Malcolm X College and relocated to its present site at 1900 W. Jackson Blvd.  The Douglas Blvd. site no longer serves as a college campus and is currently operated by the Chicago Public Schools as Theodore Herzl Elementary School. In 1971 a modernist inspired campus building based on Miesian design standards was built by architect Gene Summers at 1900 West Van Buren. Gene Summer was an assistant to the esteemed Miss Van Der Rohe and as such the former Malcolm X college campus had a look similar to the IIT campus designed by Rohe. Unfortunately the campus was demolished in 2016 to make way for a Chicago Blackhawk's training facility.

In 2016, the City of Chicago built a $251 million state-of-the-art facility and 1,500-space parking garage adjacent to the United Center, a facility to train students for careers in healthcare. The 500,000 square-foot campus would offer healthcare and general education courses, a virtual hospital, simulated healthcare technology, a dental hygiene clinic, smart technology in every classroom, a conference center, a daycare center and a 1,500-space parking garage. The campus also housed the new City Colleges of Chicago School of Nursing. The new facility was announced in 2012, completed in 2016, and opened on January 7, 2016.

Today, Malcolm X College serves as the Center of Excellence in healthcare for City Colleges of Chicago, offering a large selection of health sciences programs.

Academics
The college provides open admissions; all prospective students are admitted. Classes take place at both the main campus on Van Buren St. and at an auxiliary site, known as the West Side Learning Center, 4624 W. Madison St. Malcolm X College focuses on adult education and continuing education. The college offers a number of different degree choices, including associate degrees in arts, in general studies, in applied science, and in science. The associate in arts degree offers five different majors: business administration, English, history, psychology, and theater arts. The associate in general studies degree offers four different majors: communication and fine arts, biology, natural and behavioral sciences, and mathematics.

Beacon College for Health Science Education
Through its Beacon College for Health Science Education, Malcolm X College helps to meet the health care needs of the community. In that capacity, Malcolm X College offers the largest selection of health science career degrees and certificate programs in Cook County. Located adjacent to one of the nation's largest medical centers, the Beacon College offers students clinical affiliations.

Sports 
Malcolm X has both men's and women's collegiate sports. The college has both men's and women's basketball and cross country teams as well as a men's soccer team and a women's volleyball team. There is also intramural teams for men and women in basketball and weight lifting.

Notable alumni
Herbert C. Brown, recipient of 1979 Nobel Prize in Chemistry
 Burne Hogarth, artist, illustrator of Tarzan, teacher, and author
 Johnny Burke, lyricist, writer of popular songs in America between the 1920s and 1950s
 Alfred Cilella, Illinois politician
 Marvin R. Dee, Illinois politician, lawyer, and businessman
 Douglas Huff, Illinois politician
 Nathan J. Kaplan, Illinois jurist and politician
 Don Myrick, musician with The Pharaohs, Earth, Wind & Fire
 Bernard S. Neistein, Illinois state legislator and lawyer.
 Louis Satterfield, musician with The Pharaohs, Earth, Wind & Fire

References

External links
 Malcolm X College homepage
 Malcolm X College Library homepage

Educational institutions established in 1911
Memorials to Malcolm X
1911 establishments in Illinois
City Colleges of Chicago
Community colleges in Illinois
NJCAA athletics